Johnny Burgin (born July 17, 1969) is an American blues guitarist and harmonica player. Since 1997, he has released ten recordings under his own name and has played on numerous other recordings as a sideman.

Career  
Johnny Burgin was a student and college radio DJ at the University of Chicago when a chance encounter in 1988 with fellow DJ/harp player David Waldman, who played and recorded with Tail Dragger, Smokey Smothers and others, led to a trip to Chicago's West Side to meet and sit in with Tail Dragger.

Although Burgin had already been playing gigs since high school, his initial complete failure in an authentic blues club setting led him to throw away his guitar playing style and start from scratch. He focused on learning an authentic blues style and worked every Thursday night at Lilly's in Chicago's Lincoln Park neighborhood with the Ice Cream Men, a blues band including Steve Cushing on drums, Scott Dirks on harp and Dave Waldman on guitar. The Ice Cream Men regularly backed traditional Chicago blues artists like Golden "Big" Wheeler, Tail Dragger, Jimmy Lee Robinson and Bonnie Lee.

Burgin was then hired by Tail Dragger and began playing four nights a week on Chicago's West Side with seasoned blues performers such as Eddie Burks, Mary Lane, Johnny B. Moore, Lurrie Bell, Little Mack Simmons, Little Arthur Duncan, Jimmy Dawkins and Johnny Littlejohn, among others. He toured the Midwest with Pinetop Perkins, who often had Dave Meyers, a member of the Aces, on bass. Burgin toured nationally for two years with Sam Lay, drummer for Howlin' Wolf and Paul Butterfield.

In 1994, Burgin began a residency at Smoke Daddy, a venue in Chicago's Wicker Park neighborhood. The band featured Jimmy Burns on vocals and guitar, Martin Lang on harp, Sho Komiya on bass, and either Kenny "Beedy Eyes" Smith (son of Willie “Big Eyes” Smith, drummer for Muddy Waters) or Kelly Littleton (drummer for Lil’ Ed Williams). During the residency in 1996, Bob Koester, founder of Delmark Records, signed Jimmy Burns with Burgin's band after hearing one set.

Burgin recorded his debut CD (Straight Out of Chicago) as a band leader in 1997. Collaborations with numerous blues musicians, and European tours, followed.

In 2002, Burgin left the music business to raise his family, then returned in January 2009. In the June 1, 2015, edition of the Chicago Tribune, reporter Rick Kogan wrote, “There are few more passionate practitioners of [blues] music than Johnny Burgin.”,

Burgin released seven CDs between 2010 and 2020 and increased his touring schedule to perform more than 250 nights a year. In 2016 he moved from Chicago to California and collaborated with West Coast players such as Aki Kumar, Kid Andersen, Alabama Mike, Nick Gravenites, Nancy Wright, and Andy Santana.

Personal life 
Johnny Burgin was born July 17, 1969, in Williamsport, Pennsylvania, but grew up mostly in Starkville, Mississippi, his father's hometown.  Burgin's father was an actor and folk musician who taught Burgin how to play guitar. Burgin moved to Chicago, Illinois in 1988 to attend the University of Chicago. He is currently (2021) single, and had planned to become a writer, prior to becoming a musician.

He relocated from Chicago to Petaluma, California in 2016 and then New Orleans in 2021.  He dropped the "Rockin'" from his name in 2019 and is now billed simply as Johnny Burgin.

Discography 
AS A BAND LEADER

AS A SIDEMAN

References

External links 
 Johnny Burgin website

1969 births
American blues singers
Chicago blues musicians
20th-century American singers
Living people
20th-century American male singers